Marschall is a surname. Notable people with the surname include:

Adolf Marschall von Bieberstein (1842–1912), German politician and Secretary of State of the Foreign Office of the German Empire
Friedrich August Marschall von Bieberstein (1768–1826), early explorer of the flora and archaeology of south Imperial Russia
Georg Marschall von Ebnet (died 1505), the Prince-Bishop of Bamberg from 1503 to 1505
Christoph von Marschall (born 1959), German journalist working in the United States for the daily Berlin newspaper Der Tagesspiegel
Elisabeth Marschall (1886–1947), Head Nurse (Oberschwester) at the Ravensbrück concentration camp executed for war crimes
Ferenc Marschall (1887–1970), Hungarian politician, who served as Minister of Agriculture for two months in 1938
Ken Marschall (born 1950), American painter and illustrator notable for his paintings of famous ocean liners
Matern von Marschall (born 1962), German politician
Nicola Marschall (1829–1917), German-American artist who supported the Confederate cause during the American Civil War
Olaf Marschall (born 1966), German retired footballer and a football sports manager
Philipp Marschall (born 1988), German cross country skier who has competed since 2005
Rick Marschall (born 1949), writer/editor and comic strip historian, described as "America's foremost authority on pop culture"
Rudolf Marschall (1873–1967), Austrian sculptor and medalist, born in Vienna
Wilhelm Marschall (1886–1976), German admiral during World War II
Albrecht Marschall von Rapperswil, one of the Minnesingers featured in the Codex Manesse

See also
Marschall der DDR, the highest rank in the National People's Army of the former German Democratic Republic, never held and abolished in 1989
Marschall v Land Nordrhein Westfalen (1997), a German and EU labour law case concerning positive action
Hofmarschall
Marchal
Marsal (disambiguation)
Marshal
Marshall (disambiguation)

de:Marschall
fr:Marschall